George Anderson (born 25 December 1953) is a Scottish former footballer.

Anderson played as a defender for Morton from 1969 to 1981, and from 1985 to 1987. He is 10th on the club's post-WWII list of appearances with 342 in all competitions. He was selected by then Scotland manager Tommy Docherty for a South American tour with the senior Scottish squad prior to the 1974 World Cup. On 1 December 2017, Anderson was inducted to the Greenock Morton Hall of Fame.

References 

https://web.archive.org/web/20131029200709/http://www.pieandbovril.com/forum/index.php/topic/82375-players-from-inverclyde/

1953 births
Living people
Greenock Morton F.C. players
Scottish footballers
Scotland under-23 international footballers
People from Port Glasgow
Airdrieonians F.C. (1878) players
Association football central defenders
Scottish Football League players
Footballers from Inverclyde
Port Glasgow F.C. players
Scottish Junior Football Association players